The 1992–93 Honduran Liga Nacional season was the 27th edition of the Honduran Liga Nacional.  The format of the tournament remained the same as the previous season.  Club Deportivo Olimpia won the title after winning the regular season and the final round and qualified to the 1994 CONCACAF Champions' Cup along with runners-up C.D. Petrotela.

1992–93 teams

 Marathón (San Pedro Sula)
 Motagua (Tegucigalpa)
 Olimpia (Tegucigalpa)
 Petrotela (Tela)
 Platense (Puerto Cortés)
 Real España (San Pedro Sula)
 Real Maya (Tegucigalpa, promoted)
 Súper Estrella (Danlí)
 Victoria (La Ceiba)
 Vida (La Ceiba)

Regular season

Standings

Final round

Pentagonal standings

Results
The matches C.D. Marathón–Real C.D. España and Real España–F.C. Motagua were canceled due to lack of interest and shared points.

Top scorer
  Jorge Arriola (Real Maya) with 19 goals
  Álvaro Izquierdo (Motagua) with 17 goals

Squads

Trivia
 Super Estrella didn't win a single match this season, and had the worst defense ever with 78 goals conceded in 27 games.

References

Liga Nacional de Fútbol Profesional de Honduras seasons
1992–93 in Honduran football
Honduras